The Emblem of Karnataka is the state emblem of Karnataka, India. The emblem is based on that of the Kingdom of Mysore is carried on all official correspondences made by the Government of Karnataka.

Design

The emblem has a red shield charged with a white two-headed bird, Gandabherunda bordered in blue. 
The crest depicts the Lion Capital of Ashoka (also used as the emblem of the Government of India), on a blue circular abacus with a blue frieze carrying sculptures in high relief of a galloping horse on the left, a Dharmachakra in centre, a bull on the right, and the outlines of Dharmachakras on the extreme left and right as part of Sarnath's Ashoka Pillar. The shield is flanked on either side by red-maned, yellow lion-elephant indicating the auspicious mythological character *Gajakesari* a hybrid form of two wise and powerful animals Lion and Elephant - a mythical creature believed to be auspicious and indicate strength, authority, and intelligence.  The power of Gajakesari is believed to be upholders of stronger righteousness and spells a lot of abundance and bliss. It also refers to the fortunate momentum or energy in Hindu astrology. A person having 'Gajakesari Yoga' in his astrology chart is believed to be conquering the world as per Hindu belief, same referring to a kingdom which justifies all characteristics of a conqueror) standing on a green, leafy compartment. Below the compartment lies written in stylized Devanāgarī, the national motto of India, "सत्यमेव जयते" (Satyameva Jayate, Sanskrit for "Truth alone triumphs").

Historical emblems

Government banner
The Government of Karnataka can be represented by a banner that depicts the emblem of the state on a white background. A flag was proposed in 2018 but was not formally adopted. The unofficial Kannada flag is also in use.

See also
 Flag of Karnataka
 Jaya Bharata Jananiya Tanujate
 National Emblem of India
 List of Indian state emblems

References

Government of Karnataka
Karnataka
Karnataka
Karnataka
Karnataka